Parotocinclus maculicauda is a species of fish in the family Loricariidae. The species was originally described by Franz Steindachner in 1877. It is endemic to Southeastern Brazil and inhabits rivers.

Parotocinclus maculicauda can grow to  total length.

References

Otothyrinae
Catfish of South America
Freshwater fish of Brazil
Endemic fauna of Brazil
Fish described in 1877
Taxa named by Franz Steindachner